Amaxac de Guerrero is a municipality in Tlaxcala in south-eastern Mexico.

Climate

City Hall
Amaxac de Guerrero's City Hall was built around 60 years ago. Initially, there was only one floor, but with time and population growth, a second floor was added that houses the administrative offices. The flooring of the second story is of tongue and groove planking. There is a photo gallery of former mayors. Upon entering the building, the municipal library is to the left. It has more than five thousand books covering a wide variety of subjects. It also has internet access. The city's logo is located on the front of the building just above and to the right of the main entrance at the second floor level.

Localities
 Amaxac
 San Damián Tlacocalpan

References

Municipalities of Tlaxcala